Eastwick is a village and civil parish  east of Hertford, in the East Hertfordshire district, in the county of Hertfordshire, England. In 2011 the parish had a population of 194. The parish touches Gilston, High Wych, Hunsdon and Widford. Eastwick shares a parish council with Gilston.

Landmarks 
There are 11 listed buildings in Eastwick. Eastwick has a church called St Botolph's Church and a pub called the Lion.

History 
The name "Eastwick" means 'East specialised farm'. Eastwick was recorded in the Domesday Book as Esteuuiche. Eastwick was Esteuiche in the 11th century, Estuic in the 12th century, Estuick, Estwyk and Estwyke in the 13th century, Estwyk atte Flore in the 14th century and Eastuick in the 16th century.

See also
 The Hundred Parishes

References 

Villages in Hertfordshire
Civil parishes in Hertfordshire
East Hertfordshire District